Bobby Bosko Grubic (born Boško Grubić; on January 8, 1972) is a Croatian American producer, director, songwriter, composer, singer, entrepreneur, and environmental activist.

He is a NATAS Midsouth
 and two-time Southeast Emmy Award winner

 as director/producer for TV commercial spots and over the years has added numerous production and marketing awards to his collection. He was recognized for directing and producing two live-action short films by the Producers Guild of America Weekend Shorts Contest; which includes the action short The Parting Shot (2014) and the drama Change to Spare (2012). His creative development, directing and production experience includes: TV commercial productions, corporate videos, tourism promos, documentaries, biographies, film and video projects for domestic and international markets.

Grubic ventured into the music industry under the artist name Bobby G., his first single, which topped Croatian pop-dance radio charts, Ne Mogu Bez Tebe (Can't be Without You) was released in 2001, and his debut studio album Samo Ljubav (Simply Love) was released worldwide in 2002. His first USA National Television music airplay was in 2005 on NBC's The Today Show hosted by Matt Lauer live from Croatia, where Bobby’s song "Ne Mogu Bez Tebe (I Can't Be Without You)"
 from his album "Samo Ljubav (Simply Love)"

was used as the background music for "Today's" live clips in segments "Where in the World is Matt Lauer?" from Dubrovnik, Croatia.

From 2008 to 2010 he was the in-house Producer and Director of Broadcast Production for AIG Marketing

 and produced all of the TV, Radio and New media ads for 21st Century Insurance, prior to AIG selling the company to Farmers Insurance Group.

In 2010 he was considered for the Director of Croatian Radiotelevision (HRT).

He graduated from Nashville's nationally recognized Middle Tennessee State University Recording Industry, Production and Technology, and Entertainment technology programs and he holds a Master's Degree in Communication from Johns Hopkins University - Zanvyl Krieger School of Arts and Sciences.

Discography
 Želim Te - single (1994.)
 Gibaj - single (1996.)
 Ne Mogu Bez Tebe - single for HRF festival (2001.)
 Samo Ljubav (Simply Love)(2002.)
 Ne Mogu Bez Tebe - Maxi (2003.)
 Sve Što Imam Ja - Maxi (2004.)
 Trebaš Mi Noćas - Maxi (2005.)

Filmography 
 Jewels (2018.)
 Final Stop (2015.)
 Fit to Be Tied (2014.)
 The Parting Shot (2014.)
 Counter Play (2012.)
 Change to Spare (2012.)

Interviews
EPOHA: Bobby Boško Grubic Interview, August 31, 2020.
VEGAS MAGAZINE: Bobby B. Grubic Interview, February 8, 2017.Elia Patricia Pekica: Na Diogenovu putu, 2010.Đurđa Zorko,  Jasminka Jagačić-Borić: Sisački biografski leksikon, 2006.Matica hrvatska - Sisak: Riječ, 1999.EPOHA, Novi uspjesi, br. 84, ožujak 2008.EPOHA, Kreativnost ne poznaje granice, br. 76, srpanj 2007.EPOHA, Treći Grubićev Emmy, god.VII. br. 75, lipanj 2007.EPOHA, Od hipnotičkog brandiranja do nagrada najboljima, br. 66., rujan 2006.

References

External links
Artonix Studios
Bobby Grubic Photography
Bobby G. Music

SHOOT, The Platform Group's "Jewels" To Screen at Cannes Film Festival, 30.4.2018., 
GLAS SLAVONIJE, Bow vs Plectrum sviraju "Kit Blues", 13.1.2017., 
DELO, Goodlife Lifestyle revija, Ameriški film so kolektivni produkt, br. 29, 15.6.2015 
MTSU NEWS, Bobby Bosko Grubić and Robert Rowles, 28.1.2015., 
NOVI LIST, Grubić i Chupin u finalu izbora za najbolji kratki film PGA, 13.9.2014., 
Večernji List, Dvojica Hrvata u finalu izbora za najbolji film Američke udruge producenata, 12.09.2014., 
Slobodna Dalmacija, Hrvati u finalu izbora za najbolji film Američke udruge producenata, 12.09.2014.,
Producers Guild of America, Semi-Finalists Announced for Make Your Mark Competition, 1.8.2014.,
Slobodna Dalmacija, U Zadar stigli automobili na električni pogon, 30.05.2014., 
VARIETY, In case you missed ’ems: PGA-PGA edition, 21.10.2012., 
MTSU, EMC news, .
The Record,News & Public Affairs wins top PR awards, Vol. 8 No. 22, .
The Record,Recording Industry student wins Emmy for 30-second commercial, Vol. 7 No. 18, .
Bobby Grubic Press Releases, .
AGL Resources Recognized for Best Energy Website, .
Winner! Web Marketing Association's WebAwards, .
2008 Outstanding achievement in INTERNET ADVERTISING, .
HDS/ZAMP - Croatian Composers' Society, .
HRT, ZAPISNIK 76. sjednice Programskog vijeća HRT-a, 11.02.2010.,  .
HRT, Predstavili se kandidati za ravnatelja HRT-a, 03.02.2010., .
Slobodna Dalmacija, Mladi sisački filmaš u Americi reda uspjeh za uspjehom, 27.03.2008., .
Hrvatska Matice Iseljenika, Novi uspjesi producenta Boška Grubića, 27.03.2008., .
Jutarnji List, Bobby G Hrvatima donio i treći Emmy, 29.06.2007., .
Croatian Journalists' Association (HND), Amerikanac iz Siska s dva Emmyja želi biti ravnatelj HRT-a, 14.04.2007., .
Vjesnik, Oglašivačima godišnji promet 4,5 milijardi kuna, 20.09.2006., .
Slobodna Dalmacija, Inspiracija - žene, 15.7.2002., .

1972 births
Living people
Croatian pop singers
Croatian songwriters
21st-century Croatian male singers
Croatian film directors
Directors
People from Sisak
Croatian emigrants to the United States
American film directors
American film producers
American male screenwriters
American television composers
American television directors
American television producers
Croatian music video directors
20th-century Croatian male singers
Regional Emmy Award winners